Ashmeet Sidana is an American businessman, entrepreneur and venture capitalist. He is the Founder, Chief Engineer and Managing Partner of Engineering Capital.

Education 
Sidana obtained a B.Sc. from USC in 1989, a M.Sc. in Computer Science from Stanford University in 1991 and graduated with an MBA from Wharton in 2003.

Career 
Sidana started his career at Hewlett Packard and then worked at Silicon Graphics, where he worked as an engineer. Subsequently, he founded Sidana Systems, where he served as Chief Executive Officer until the company was bought by Doclinx.

He then worked at VMware, where he was in charge of product management for the company's product ESX Server. Until 2013, Sidana then worked with Foundation Capital, a venture capital fund.

Engineering Capital 
In 2015, Sidana launched his own venture capital fund, Engineering Capital, with plans to focus his initial $32 million investment fund and portfolio on 10-15 start-ups from the infrastructure technology (IT and engineering) sector.

For his second investment fund, Sidana raised $50 million.

Additional affiliations 
Sidana has invested in and sat on the boards of: Freewheel (acquired by Comcast), InQuira (acquired by Oracle), Altor (acquired by Juniper), Appurify (acquired by Google), and PrivateCore (acquired by Facebook).

He currently still is affiliated with Zetta.net, SimplyHired, Azure Power, Baffle (stealth), Datos IO, Kentik, Menlo Security, Palerra, SignalFX, StackStorm, and Xockets.

Personal life 
Sidana is an action traveler and has summited Mt. Everest once.

References 

University of Southern California alumni
Stanford University alumni
Wharton School of the University of Pennsylvania alumni
American company founders
Venture capitalists
American engineers
American venture capitalists
Year of birth missing (living people)
Living people